Jaroslav Dittrich  (born 8 March 1982 in Prague, Czech Republic) is a Czech football player who has made more than 40 appearances in the Gambrinus Liga, the top Czech football league.

References
Guardian Football

Profile at FK Baník Sokolov website 

Czech footballers
Czech First League players
FK Baník Sokolov players
FK Mladá Boleslav players
FC Slovan Liberec players
FK Bohemians Prague (Střížkov) players
1982 births
Living people

Association football midfielders
FC Oberlausitz Neugersdorf players